The Consulate General of Israel to the Pacific Northwest Region, is one of Israel’s diplomatic missions abroad, located at 456 Montgomery Street Suite #2100 in San Francisco, California, United States of America in the Financial District.

The Consulate General of Israel to the Pacific Northwest region is responsible for the states of Alaska, Northern California, Idaho, Montana, Oregon and Washington.

List of Israel Consul Generals
Shlomi Kofman 2016–Present
Dr. Andy David 2012–2017
Akiva Tor 2008–2012
David Akov 2004–2008
Yosef Amrani 2000–2004
Daniel Shek 1997–2000

Israel Deputy Consul Generals
Matan Zamir 2019–Present
Ravit Baer 2015–2019
Eyal Naor 2013–2015
Gideon Lustig 2009–2013
Ismail Khaldi (First Bedouin Israeli Diplomat) 2006–2009
Omer Caspi 2002–2006
Gil Lainer 2000–2002

History
Israeli Innovations at the Exploratorium – On Tuesday, June 18, 2013, the Moving Toys Workshop exhibit was at the Exploratorium in San Francisco.
Israel-China Cultural Festival – The first Israel-China Cultural Festival was held for one month in June 2012 in the San Francisco Bay Area. 
SFJazz Presents: Israeli Jazzfest – From Saturday April 28 to Sunday, April 29, 2012, three Israeli Jazz performances took place at the San Francisco Jewish Community Center.
Israeli President in Bay Area – In March 2012, President of Israel Shimon Peres made a historic visit to the San Francisco Bay Area. 
Israeli Consulate’s tribute to Black History Month – A month long events during Black History Month in February 2011. 
Out In Israel – April 2010 celebrated Israeli LGBT Cultural in the San Francisco Bay Area. Events dotted the month and included films, meals, and performances.

Northwest Region sister cities

 Ashkelon-Sacramento
 Ashkelon-Portland
 Beer Sheva-Seattle
 Haifa-San Francisco

See also

 List of diplomatic missions in San Francisco
 List of diplomatic missions of Israel
 List of Israeli twin towns and sister cities
 Israel–United States relations

References

External links
 The Consulate General of Israel to the Pacific Northwest

United States
Israel
Israel–United States relations